The El Salvador women's Under 17's football team, is controlled by Federación Salvadoreña de Fútbol and represents El Salvador in international women's Under 17 or youth football competitions.

CONCACAF Women's U-17 Championship

Coaches
 Julio Cesar Ramos (2007-2008)
 Marcial Turcios (2008-2009)
 Ricardo Herrera (2009-)

FIFA U-17 Women's World Cup Record

All-time record against other nations
As of June 3, 2013

See also
 El Salvador women's national football team
 Federación Salvadoreña de Fútbol

External links
 http://www.fesfut.org.sv/seleccion_info.php?id_seleccion=81

under
El Salvador
Women's national under-17 association football teams